John David Smith (March 3, 1899 – September 29, 1973) was a Canadian rower who competed in the 1924 Summer Olympics. In 1924, he won the silver medal as a  crew member of the Canadian boat in the eights event. He died in the Toronto suburb of Scarborough, Ontario in 1973.

References

External links
John Smith's profile at databaseOlympics
John Smith's profile at Sports Reference.com

1899 births
1973 deaths
Canadian male rowers
Olympic rowers of Canada
Olympic silver medalists for Canada
Rowers at the 1924 Summer Olympics
Olympic medalists in rowing
Medalists at the 1924 Summer Olympics